Tanner Blake Berryhill (born November 29, 1993) is an American professional stock car racing driver who competes for Tyler Thomas Motorsports in Dirt Midgets, driving the No. 91B Toyota. He has also competed in the NASCAR Cup Series, NASCAR Xfinity Series, ARCA Menards Series, and ARCA Menards Series East in the past.

Racing career
Berryhill is a veteran of Legends and midget car racing. He made his debut in NASCAR competition in 2011, driving in seven K&N Pro Series East races before moving to the Nationwide Series in 2012.

In 2014, Berryhill ran the whole season with Vision Racing. During qualifying at Talladega, Berryhill was involved in a single-car accident when Kyle Larson came down into him. He would be replaced by Chad Boat, as he and Billy Boat Motorsports used the No. 17 owner points to qualify into the race. His best finish was a 17th place finish at Mid-Ohio. Berryhill would finish 22nd in points. 

In March 2015, Berryhill announced his attempt to make his Sprint Cup Series debut in the CampingWorld.com 500 at Phoenix International Raceway, driving the No. 66 Premium Motorsports Chevrolet SS. A successful attempt would have made him the first Oklahoma driver in NASCAR's highest division in 34 years. However, he failed to qualify. Berryhill returned to the team for the Sprint All-Star Race's Sprint Showdown, finishing 27th and 21st in the two segments.

After being absent from NASCAR for a few years, on September 21, 2018, it was announced that Berryhill would attempt the Charlotte Roval race in the No. 97 car for Obaika Racing. However, he did not qualify for the race.

On November 6, 2018, Berryhill announced he would drive the No. 97 Toyota for Obaika Racing at Phoenix, where he made his first Cup Series qualifying attempt three years prior. He started the race 36th but was involved in an accident and did not finish the race, scoring in 31st. On December 3, he stated that he would be running the full 2019 Cup schedule with Obaika, though the team skipped the 2019 Daytona 500 due to funding issues. Originally the Obaika team was scheduled to return the following race, but the team instead temporarily suspended operations, after briefly being on the entry list for the race at Texas Motor Speedway. Berryhill departed the team shortly thereafter.

On May 3, 2021, it was announced that Berryhill would return to NASCAR after spending the previous two years without a ride, and would drive the No. 23 for Our Motorsports at Darlington in May and both races at Texas.

Motorsports career results

NASCAR
(key) (Bold – Pole position awarded by qualifying time. Italics – Pole position earned by points standings or practice time. * – Most laps led.)

Monster Energy Cup Series

Xfinity Series

 Season still in progress 
 Ineligible for series points

K&N Pro Series East

ARCA Racing Series
(key) (Bold – Pole position awarded by qualifying time. Italics – Pole position earned by points standings or practice time. * – Most laps led.)

References

External links

 
 

Living people
1993 births
People from Bixby, Oklahoma
Racing drivers from Oklahoma
NASCAR drivers
ARCA Menards Series drivers